Anastasija Krstović (born 21 July 2003) is a Montenegrin footballer who plays as a goalkeeper for Women's League club ŽFK Budućnost and the Montenegro women's national team.

Club career
Krstović has played for Budućnost in Montenegro.

International career
Krstović made her senior debut for Montenegro on 21 February 2021.

References

External links

2003 births
Living people
Montenegrin women's footballers
Women's association football goalkeepers
ŽFK Budućnost Podgorica players
Montenegro women's international footballers